Otto Schenk (born 12 June 1930, in Vienna) is an Austrian actor, and theater and opera director.

Life and career
Schenk was born to Catholic parents. His father, a lawyer, had Jewish roots and therefore lost his job after the Anschluss in 1938. His mother was Italian. Schenk studied acting at the Max Reinhardt Seminar, and started his acting career at the Theater in der Josefstadt and the Wiener Volkstheater, and as a comedian at Vienna's Kabarett Simpl. His directing career began in 1953 at small Viennese venues, later leading him to renowned stages like the Burgtheater, the Munich Kammerspiele or the Salzburg Festival, staging plays by William Shakespeare, Arthur Schnitzler, Ödön von Horváth, Anton Chekhov. In 1957, Schenk directed his first opera, Mozart's The Magic Flute for the Salzburg Landestheater. His breakthrough as an opera director came in 1962 with Alban Berg's Lulu at the Theater an der Wien. This production was later moved to the Vienna State Opera, where Schenk debuted in 1964 with Leoš Janáček's Jenůfa. He was contracted by the State Opera as a permanent producer for several seasons, while continuing his free-lance career as an actor, comedian and director in Austria and Germany, working for theaters, opera houses and television productions. In 1965 Austrian television engaged him to direct a studio production of Verdi's Othello sung in German with a stellar cast. During the 1970s and 1980s, Schenk was hired by La Scala, the Royal Opera House in Covent Garden, and German opera houses such as the Berlin State Opera, the Bavarian State Opera and the Hamburg State Opera. Schenk's operatic productions included works by Mozart, Gaetano Donizetti, Giuseppe Verdi, Antonín Dvořák, Giacomo Puccini, Richard Strauss, Richard Wagner, Ernst Krenek, and Friedrich Cerha.

In the United States, Schenk is especially known for his lavish, realist, traditionalist stagings at the Metropolitan Opera, most notably his production of Richard Wagner's four-opera epic Der Ring des Nibelungen which was hailed by traditionalist Wagnerian opera fans as one of the closest productions to Wagner's true vision. The production was retired from the Met in 2009. Schenk had debuted at the Met with Puccini's Tosca in 1968; his 2006 farewell production was Donizetti's Don Pasquale with Anna Netrebko.

Schenk has appeared in over 30 films (mostly in German). In 1973, he directed , a film based on Arthur Schnitzler's Reigen (with Helmut Berger, Sydne Rome, Senta Berger). Schenk also starred in the stage adaptation of Lily Brett's Chuzpe at the Kammerspiele Theatre in Vienna.

Selected works as opera producer, director 
 Die Zauberflöte (1957), Landestheater Salzburg.  Debut as an opera director
 Lulu (1962), Vienna State Opera (Karl Böhm conducting)
 Othello (opera) (1965), Wiener Sängerknaben, Argeo Quadri, conductor, Directed for Austrian Television
 Carmen (1966), Vienna State Opera (Lorin Maazel conducting; with Christa Ludwig as Carmen)
 Don Giovanni (15 June 1967), Vienna State Opera (designed by Luciano Damiani; Josef Krips conducting, with Cesare Siepi as Don Giovanni and Erich Kunz as Leporello)
 Der Rosenkavalier (1968), Vienna State Opera (Leonard Bernstein conducting)
 Fidelio (1970), Vienna State Opera (Leonard Bernstein conducting)
 Die Fledermaus (1972), Bavarian State Opera Munich
 Le nozze di Figaro (1974), La Scala (Claudio Abbado conducting, with Mirella Freni as the countess, José van Dam as Figaro, and Teresa Berganza as Cherubino)
 Un ballo in maschera (1975), Royal Opera House, (Claudio Abbado conducting, with Plácido Domingo, Katia Ricciarelli, Reri Grist, Piero Cappuccilli)
 Tannhäuser (1977), Metropolitan Opera.  Still in use at the Met.
 Andrea Chénier (1981), Vienna State Opera (Nello Santi conducting, with Plácido Domingo in the title role)
 Baal (1981, premier), Salzburger Festival (later Vienna State Opera)
 Der Freischütz (1983), Bregenzer Festival
 Der Ring des Nibelungen (1986), Metropolitan Opera (James Levine conducting).  Retired from the Met in May 2009.
 Manon Lescaut (1986), Vienna State Opera (Giuseppe Sinopoli conducting, with Mirella Freni as Manon)
 Die Zauberflöte (1988), Vienna State Opera (Nikolaus Harnoncourt conducting, with Jerry Hadley as Tamino and Luciana Serra as the Queen of the Night)
 Rigoletto (1989), Metropolitan Opera (Marcello Panni conducting, with Leo Nucci in the title role, Luciano Pavarotti as the Duke and June Anderson as Gilda).
 Parsifal (1991), Metropolitan Opera (James Levine conducting, with Plácido Domingo in the title role).
 Elektra (1992), Metropolitan Opera (Deborah Voigt as Chrysothemis).
 Die Meistersinger von Nürnberg (1993), Metropolitan Opera (James Levine conducting).  Still in use at the Met.
 Rusalka (1987), Vienna State Opera (with Gabriela Beňačková as Rusalka and Václav Neumann conducting).
 Don Pasquale (31 March 2006), Metropolitan Opera (Maurizio Benini conducting, standing in for an injured James Levine), with Anna Netrebko as Norina and Juan Diego Flórez as Ernesto

The Metropolitan Opera currently uses his productions of  Die Meistersinger von Nürnberg, Tannhäuser, Arabella, and  Don Pasquale.  Many of his productions are available on DVD, including his Vienna State Opera productions of Fidelio and Rosenkavalier, and his Met productions of  Parsifal, Die Meistersinger von Nürnberg, Tannhäuser and Der Ring des Nibelungen. In October 2010, Schenk returned to the Met to revive his Don Pasquale with Netrebko. In December 2010, he revived his Rosenkavalier (conducted by Asher Fish, cast including Adrianne Pieczonka) at the Vienna State Opera.

Selected filmography
 Dunja (1955)
 Always Trouble with the Reverend (1972)
  (1973) (a remake of Max Ophüls's 1950 film La Ronde, based on Schnitzler's play)
 Arabella (1977)
  (1981, TV film)

References

 External links 
 New York Times review of Schenk's 2006 Don Pasquale''

1930 births
Living people
Austrian people of Jewish descent
Austrian opera directors
Austrian television directors
Male actors from Vienna
Austrian male film actors
Austrian male television actors
Austrian male voice actors
20th-century Austrian male actors
21st-century Austrian male actors